Kosh-Yelga (Quşyılğa) is a rural locality (a selo) and the administrative centre of Kosh-Yelginsky Selsoviet, Bizhbulyaksky District, Bashkortostan, Russia. The population was 759 as of 2010. There are 22 streets.

Geography 
Kosh-Yelga is located 41 km north of Bizhbulyak (the district's administrative centre) by road. Petrovka is the nearest rural locality.

References 

Rural localities in Bizhbulyaksky District